Axel Kristiansson  (1914–1999) was a Swedish politician. He was a member of the Centre Party.

References
 This article was initially translated from the Swedish Wikipedia article.

Centre Party (Sweden) politicians
1914 births
1999 deaths
Members of the Första kammaren
20th-century Swedish politicians